Manduyog Hill is a religious sanctuary located east of the Aklan State University, Banga, Aklan, the Philippines.

The top of the hill has a large white cross. Manduyog Hill also has a chapel and the 14 Stations of the Cross. Visitors conduct annual pilgrimages every Holy Week on Good Friday. However, there are also tourists that just enjoy the hill's environment.

References

Landforms of Aklan
Hills of the Philippines
Tourist attractions in Aklan